A Tribute to Curtis Mayfield is a compilation album of various artists, celebrating the music of Curtis Mayfield. While many tribute albums are recorded after an artist has passed, this album was completed five years before Mayfield's death.

Track listing
All songs written by Curtis Mayfield except "Amen", by Mayfield and John W. Pate Sr.

"Choice of Colors" – Gladys Knight – (3:52)
"It's All Right" – Steve Winwood – (4:21)
"Let's Do It Again" – Repercussions and Curtis Mayfield – (4:55)
"Billy Jack" – Lenny Kravitz – (6:18)
"Look Into Your Heart" – Whitney Houston – (3:54)
"Gypsy Woman" – Bruce Springsteen – (3:34)
"You Must Believe Me" – Eric Clapton – (4:28)
"I'm So Proud" – The Isley Brothers – (4:57)
"Fool for You" – Branford Marsalis and The Impressions – (3:45)
"Keep On Pushin'" – Tevin Campbell – (3:21)
"The Makings of You" – Aretha Franklin – (4:26)
"Woman's Got Soul" – B.B. King – (3:49)
"People Get Ready" – Rod Stewart – (5:01)
"(Don't Worry) If There's a Hell Below, We're All Going to Go" – Narada Michael Walden – (5:09)
"I've Been Trying" – Phil Collins – (5:01)
"I'm the One Who Loves You" – Stevie Wonder – (3:58)
"Amen" – Elton John and Sounds of Blackness – (4:41)

Personnel

1. "Choice of Colors"
Gladys Knight – lead vocals
Voncille Faggotte, Jackie Simley Kee and Reggie Burrell – backing vocals

2. "It's All Right!"
Steve Winwood – lead vocals, piano, organ, bass, guitar
Jim Capaldi – drums, backing vocals

3. "Let's Do It Again"
Repercussions:
Nicole "Bubba Diva" Willis – lead and backing vocals
Gordon "Nappy G." Clay – timbales, bongos, percussion
Andy Faranda – guitar
Jonathan Maron – bass guitar
Genji Siraisi – drums
Daniel "Chief Abbott D." Wyatt – congas

With:
Curtis Mayfield – lead and backing vocals
Paul Griffin – piano, organ, clavinet
Scott Barkham – Fender Rhodes
Dave Bargeron – trombone
Randy Brecker – trumpet
Lou Soloff – trumpet
Lou Marini – tenor and alto saxophone, flute

4. "Billy Jack"
Lenny Kravitz – drums, bass guitar, acoustic and electric guitars
Craig Ross – electric guitar
Henry Hirsch – mellotron strings

5. "Look Into Your Heart"
Whitney Houston – lead vocals
Louis "Kingpin" Biancaniello – keyboards, drum programming, Moog bass
Narada Michael Walden – magic tambourine
Claytoven Richardson, Sandy Griffith and Annie Stocking – backing vocals

6. "Gypsy Woman"
Bruce Springsteen – acoustic guitar, vocals
Tommy Sims – keyboards, Hammond B-3, bass guitar, percussion
Jerry McPherson – guitar
Dann Huff – guitar
Danny Duncan – MIDI programming

7. "You Must Believe Me"
Eric Clapton – guitar, lead vocals
Nile Rodgers – guitar
Sterling Campbell – drums
Barry Campbell – bass guitar
Richard Hilton – keyboards
John Powe, Shawn Powe, Demetrius Peete and John Clay – backing vocals

8. "I'm So Proud"
Ronald Isley – vocals
Ernie Isley – guitar
Angela Winbush-Isley – synthesizers, keyboards, drum programming

9. "Fool for You"
Branford Marsalis – tenor and soprano saxophones
Kenny Kirkland – piano
Tony Maiden – guitar
Matt Finders – trombone
Sal Marquez – trumpet

10. "Keep On Pushin'"
Tevin Campbell – lead vocals
Narada Michael Walden – drums
Frank "Killer Bee" Martin – keyboards
Vernon "Ice" Black – wah-wah guitar
Stef Burns – guitar
Myron Dove – bass guitar
Clayoven Richardson, Skyler Jett, Tony Lindsay and Dooney Jones – backing vocals

Horn section:
Wayne Wallace – trombone
Robbie Kwock – trumpet
Melecio Magdaluyo – saxophone
Ron Stallings – saxophone
Martin Wehner – trombone
Louis Fasman – trumpet

11. "The Makings of You"
Aretha Franklin – lead vocals
Robbie Kondor – keyboards
David Spinoza – guitar
Will Lee – bass guitar
Anton Fig – drums
Joe Mardin – percussion, synthesizers
Andy Snitzer – alto saxophone

12. "Woman's Got Soul"
B.B. King – lead guitar, vocals
Joe Sample – piano
Neal Larsen – organ
Arthur Adams – guitar
Freddie Washington – bass guitar
Alvino Bennett – drums
Kevin Ricard – percussion
Arnold McCuller, Sweet Pea Atkinson and Sir Harry Browns – backing vocals

Tower of Power Horn Section:
Doc Kupka – baritone saxophone
Emilio Castillo – tenor saxophone
David Mann – tenor saxophone
Greg Adams – trumpet
Lee Thornburg – trumpet

13. "People Get Ready"
Rod Stewart – vocals, banjo
Ronnie Wood – guitar
Carmine Rojas – bass guitar
Jeff Golub – guitar
Charles Kentiss III – piano, organ
Kevin Savigar – piano, organ, accordion
Jim Cregan – guitar
Don Teschner – guitar, violin, mandolin
Phil Parapiano – accordion, mandolin
Dorian Holly, Darryl Phinessee and Fred White – backing vocals

14. "(Don't Worry) If There's a Hell Below, We're All Going to Go"
Narada Michael Walden – vocals, drums
Louis "Kingpin" Biancaniello – synth strings
Mike "$" Mani – keyboards
Vernon "Ice" Black – lead guitar
Stef Burns – rhythm guitar
Myron Dove – bass guitar
Michael Carabello – percussion

Horn section:
Wayne Wallace – trombone
Robbie Kwock – trumpet
Melecio Magdaluyo – saxophone
Ron Stallings – saxophone
Martin Wehner – trombone
Louis Fasman – trumpet

15. "I've Been Trying"
Phil Collins – vocals, all instruments

16. "I'm the One Who Loves You"
Stevie Wonder – lead vocals, all instruments
Terence Trent D'Arby, Johnny Gill, Kenny Greene, Clinton "Buddy" Wike, and Jeff Sanders – backing vocals

17. "Amen"
Elton John – lead vocals
Sounds of Blackness – backing vocals
"L.A." Reid – drums, percussion
Tony Rich – keyboards
Kayo – bass guitar
Riko Marable – organ

Charts

Weekly charts

Year-end charts

References

Curtis Mayfield tribute albums
1994 compilation albums
Warner Records compilation albums
Rock compilation albums
Rhythm and blues compilation albums
Albums produced by Narada Michael Walden
Albums produced by Arif Mardin
Albums produced by Patrick Leonard
Albums produced by Phil Collins
Albums produced by Stevie Wonder
Albums produced by L.A. Reid